Diplomatstaden (Swedish for "Diplomat City") is a neighbourhood in the Östermalm district in central Stockholm, Sweden. As the name suggests, the neighbourhood is the home of many embassies and ambassadorial residencies.

Diplomatstaden encompasses the area facing the Djurgårdsbrunnsviken bay which is located south of the easternmost part of Strandvägen.  It is an exclusive residential area composed of a group of brick villas built mostly in the 1910s and 1920s.

History 
The municipal council had scrapped its plans for a Nobel institute in the neighbouring Nobel Park (Nobelparken) in 1906.  Instead, city planning authority Per Olof Hallman designed a city plan for the area in 1911 and 1914. His plan strictly specified what materials should be used and detailed much of the exterior shapes of the buildings.  Additionally, the irregularly shaped sites, over time increasingly criticised by involved architects, strongly dictated the design of the buildings.  Most buildings facing the street passing north of the area are surrounded by walls, while open gardens surround those facing the southern waterfront.

Hallman placed the villas in a semicircle around St Peter and St Sigfrid's Church, known locally as the "English Church" (Engelska kyrkan).  Designed by James Souttar in 1863, the church was originally located at Wallingatan north of the Norra Bantorget square, but was moved brick by brick to its present location in 1913.  The first villa to be built was banker Philip Geber's (5, Nobelgatan), designed by Ragnar Östberg in 1913.  Two years later, United Kingdom had their embassy built (7, Nobelgatan) to the design of British architect Sir Richard Allison.

Villas
The villas in the area are:

Notes

References

External links 

 

Geography of Stockholm
Diplomatic districts